Mohamed Sedki Debchi (born 28 October 1999) is a Tunisian professional footballer who plays as a goalkeeper for Tunisian Ligue Professionnelle 1 club Espérance de Tunis.

References

External links

1999 births
Living people
People from Gabès
Tunisian footballers
Tunisia international footballers
Association football goalkeepers
Espérance Sportive de Tunis players